Simeone Ciburri (active 1591–1624) was an Italian painter of the early-Baroque period. Born in Perugia, where he painted in the style of Federico Barocci, although maybe a pupil of Benedetto Bandiera. He died in Gubbio.

He painted for the following churches:
Santa Maria degli Angeli, Assisi
San Francesco del Monte, Perugia
Perugia Cathedral

References

16th-century births
1634 deaths
17th-century Italian painters
Italian male painters
Italian Baroque painters
Umbrian painters